The General Aviation Design Bureau of Ukraine is a Ukrainian aircraft manufacturer based in Kyiv. The company specializes in aerospace subcontract work, often for European and North American manufacturers.

The organization has also designed and manufactured ultralight trikes, starting initially as a sub-contractor for designs like the T-2 Maverick for the western training market and then later producing the design under its own name. The T-2 has an unusual side-by-side configuration that makes it especially well suited for use as a trainer.

The General Aviation Design Bureau T-32 Maverick is an original design and noted as an unusual three-seat ultralight trike design, with a double rear seat for two passengers.

Aircraft

References

External links

Aircraft manufacturers of Ukraine
Manufacturing companies based in Kyiv
Ultralight trikes
Ukroboronprom